Moulay Bouzerktoun is a small town and rural commune in Essaouira Province of the Marrakech-Tensift-Al Haouz region of Morocco. At the time of the 2004 census, the commune had a total population of 5969 people living in 1069 households.

Waves and wind

From spring to fall the waves are said to be exceptional. Many surfers Consider the Moulay waves to be ideal. Moulay Bouzarqtoune has a Northeast trade-wind named 'Charki', which blows throughout the year. It increases speed from mid-March until mid-September, reaching force 7 at times. The wind is less consistent in the Winter.

Services offered in Moulay Bouzarqtoune include windsurfing lessons and equipment rental. One venue called "Magic Fun" is 25 km north of Essaouira and opened in 2007.

References

Populated places in Essaouira Province
Rural communes of Marrakesh-Safi